Acrocercops cissiella is a moth of the family Gracillariidae. It is known from Cuba.

The larvae feed on Hibiscus elatus, Cissampelos species (including Cissampelos verticillata) and Vitis species. They probably mine the leaves of their host plant.

References

cissiella
Moths of the Caribbean
Moths described in 1934
Endemic fauna of Cuba